The 2019 Eastern Intercollegiate Volleyball Association Tournament was the men's volleyball tournament for the Eastern Intercollegiate Volleyball Association during the 2019 NCAA Division I & II men's volleyball season. It was held April 18 through April 20, 2019 at Princeton University's Dillon Gymnasium. The winner received The Association's automatic bid to the 2019 NCAA Volleyball Tournament.

Seeds
The top four teams qualified for the tournament, with the highest seed hosting each round. Teams were seeded by record within the conference, with a tiebreaker system to seed teams with identical conference records.

Schedule and results

Bracket

The title was Princeton's second ever men's volleyball title, the first having occurred back in 1998.

References

2019 Eastern Intercollegiate Volleyball Association season
2019 NCAA Division I & II men's volleyball season
Volleyball competitions in the United States